The AD Scout (also known as the Sparrow) was designed by Harris Booth of the British Admiralty's Air Department as a fighter aircraft to defend Britain from Zeppelin bombers during World War I.

Design and development
The Scout was a very unconventional aircraft – a biplane with a fuselage pod mounted on the upper wing. A twin-rudder tail was attached by four booms, and it was provided with an extremely narrow-track undercarriage. The primary armament was intended to be a 2-pounder recoilless Davis Gun, but this was never fitted. Four prototypes were ordered in 1915, and two each were built by Hewlett & Blondeau and the Blackburn Aeroplane & Motor Company.

Operational history
Trials flown by pilots of the Royal Naval Air Service at Chingford proved the aircraft to be seriously overweight, fragile, sluggish, and difficult to handle, even on the ground. The project was abandoned, and all four prototypes were scrapped.

Operators

Royal Naval Air Service

Specifications (AD Scout)

References
Notes

Cancelled military aircraft projects of the United Kingdom
Scout
Blackburn aircraft
1910s British fighter aircraft
Single-engined pusher aircraft
Twin-boom aircraft
Aircraft first flown in 1915
Rotary-engined aircraft